Riffle Creek is a stream in the U.S. state of West Virginia. It is a tributary of the Tygart Valley River.

Riffle Creek has the name of Frank Riffle.

See also
List of rivers of West Virginia

References

Rivers of Randolph County, West Virginia
Rivers of West Virginia